Vosta Kola (also Romanized as Vosţá Kolā, Vostā Kalā, and Vostā Kolā) is a village in Dasht-e Sar Rural District, Dabudasht District, Amol County, Mazandaran Province, Iran. At the 2006 census, its population was 4,092, in 988 families.

References 

Populated places in Amol County